Islamic government may refer to:

 A form of government practised by states which call themselves Islamic republics.
 Caliphate
 Islamic democracy
 Sharia Law.
 An Islamic state
 The book Islamic Government: Governance of the Jurist, by Ayatollah Ruhollah Khomeini of Iran